Andy Mark C. Barroca (born April 25, 1986) is a Filipino professional basketball player for the Magnolia Hotshots of the Philippine Basketball Association (PBA). He currently wears the number 14 to imply the birthdate of his wife.

Professional career
Barroca, along with 33 other rookies led by Smart Gilas teammates JVee Casio, Chris Lutz, Marcio Lassiter, Mac Baracael, Jason Ballesteros, and Dylan Ababou applied for the 2011 PBA draft. On draft day, he was taken 5th overall by the Shopinas.com Clickers, who immediately dealt him to the B-Meg Llamados in a three-team trade that also involved the Llamados' Don Allado and fellow rookie draftee Brian Ilad, and the Barako Bull's Elmer Espiritu.

During his rookie season, he did not spend a lot of time on the floor with guards like Roger Yap, Josh Urbiztondo, and Jonas Villanueva all leading the Llamados. Averaging just 17 minutes per game, he was learning from the likes of Johnny Abarrientos and Olsen Racela, now serving as Tim Cone's assistant coaches who are both considered among the greatest backcourt generals in the PBA. He claimed his first PBA championship with the Denzel Bowles-powered B-Meg during the 2012 PBA Commissioner's Cup.

Tides would change however, those three veteran point guards exited. Yap was released, then Urbiztondo and Villanueva were dealt to Barako Bull.  That paved the way for Barroca to earn the starting point guard spot in his sophomore season.  As the main playmaker of the team, he led the Llamados (now playing as San Mig Coffee Mixers) to win the 2013 PBA Governor's Cup at the expense of the Petron Blaze Boosters.

Barroca played close to 34 minutes of average per game in the 2013–14 PBA Philippine Cup and evolved into a clutch player down the stretch. He led the Mixers to their 11th championship by winning the 2013–14 PBA Philippine Cup, at the expense of Rain or Shine Elasto Painters.  Because of his efforts, he was awarded as the PBA Press Corps-Papa John's Pizza Finals MVP.

During the 2014 PBA All-Star Weekend, he added another highlight to his breakout year by winning the Obstacle Challenge, dethroning fellow FEU alumnus and Air21 point guard Jonas Villanueva.

In the 2018 Governors' Cup Finals, Barroca averaged 11.0 points per game, 3.2 rebounds per game, 3.2 assists per game and 1.8 steals per game as the Magnolia Hotshots won the finals series against the Alaska Aces.

On July 24, 2022, in a 98–89 victory over the NLEX Road Warriors, Barroca scored 24 points as he became the 94th player (90th local player) in PBA History to record 5,000 career points.

PBA career statistics

As of the end of 2021 season

Season-by-season averages

|-
| align=left | 
| align=left | B-Meg
| 62 || 17.4 || .402 || .277 || .744 || 2.3 || 1.1 || .7 || .2 || 5.4
|-
| align=left | 
| align=left | San Mig Coffee
| 64 || 29.2 || .404 || .302 || .729 || 3.7 || 3.5 || 1.4 || .1 || 8.7
|-
| align=left | 
| align=left | San Mig Super Coffee
| 71 || 30.6 || .396 || .233 || .746 || 3.8 || 3.3 || 1.6 || .4 || 10.7
|-
| align=left | 
| align=left | Purefoods / Star
| 45 || 28.5 || .420 || .343 || .766 || 4.2 || 2.6 || 1.2 || .1 || 10.4
|-
| align=left | 
| align=left | Star
| 36 || 31.0 || .401 || .356 || .782 || 4.5 || 3.9 || 1.2 || .2 || 10.2
|-
| align=left | 
| align=left | Star
| 52 || 27.2 || .382 || .258 || .646 || 3.1 || 3.4 || 1.6 || .2 || 9.1
|-
| align=left | 
| align=left | Magnolia
| 57 || 30.9 || .403 || .327 || .737 || 3.5 || 3.9 || 1.9 || .2 || 11.8
|-
| align=left | 
| align=left | Magnolia
| 53 || 31.6 || .382 || .347 || .714 || 3.5 || 3.6 || 1.4 || .2 || 11.7
|-
| align=left | 
| align=left | Magnolia
| 12 || 29.4 || .398 || .256 || .714 || 3.5 || 4.8 || 2.3 || .1 || 11.1
|-
| align=left | 
| align=left | Magnolia
| 41 || 30.8 || .442 || .319 || .797 || 3.6 || 5.0 || 1.2 || .1 || 11.2
|-class=sortbottom
| align=center colspan=2 | Career
| 493 || 28.4 || .402 || .308|| .740 || 3.5 || 3.3 || 1.4 || .2 || 9.8

International career
Barroca went on to become part of Rajko Toroman's Smart Gilas Pilipinas national basketball team in 2009, together with his other teammates from FEU, Mac Baracael and Aldrech Ramos. He immediately showcased what he was capable of doing of, scoring 36 points in an exhibition game against PBA's Burger King. When Smart Gilas participated in the 2011 PBA Commissioner's Cup where the team finished in second place after the elimination round, he averaged 8.2 points and 2.7 assists in 17.2 minutes of play.

Along with the best amateur athletes, he went all over the globe, training in several camps in Serbia, Australia, United States, and Dubai while playing in prestigious tournaments like the Asian Games, FIBA Asia Champions Cup, FIBA Asia Stankovic Cup, Dubai International Basketball Tournament, and the 2011 FIBA Asia Championship in Wuhan, China that culminated his 3-year stay with Smart Gilas.

Personal life
Barroca is married to former Ruselle Ann Alinea, and has one daughter, named Natalie Faith.  Their love story was featured in an episode of Kapuso Mo, Jessica Soho.

He idolizes Manny Pacquiao and even played with him in a friendly basketball game during his visit to Pacquiao's mansion in General Santos.

References

1986 births
Living people
2019 FIBA Basketball World Cup players
Air21 Express draft picks
Asian Games competitors for the Philippines
Basketball players at the 2010 Asian Games
Basketball players from Zamboanga del Sur
FEU Tamaraws basketball players
Filipino men's basketball players
Magnolia Hotshots players
Philippine Basketball Association All-Stars
Philippines men's national basketball team players
Point guards
Sportspeople from Zamboanga City